The Irish League in season 1909–10 comprised 8 teams, and Cliftonville won the championship.

League standings

Results

References
Northern Ireland - List of final tables (RSSSF)

1909-10
1909–10 in European association football leagues
Irish